
Year 3 BC was a common year starting on Wednesday or Thursday (link will display the full calendar) of the Julian calendar (the sources differ, see leap year error for further information) and a common year starting on Tuesday of the Proleptic Julian calendar. At the time, it was known as the Year of the Consulship of Lentulus and Messalla (or, less frequently, year 751 Ab urbe condita). The denomination 3 BC for this year has been used since the early medieval period, when the Anno Domini calendar era became the prevalent method in Europe for naming years.

Events 
 By place 

 Roman Empire 
 King Maroboduus of the Marcomanni organises, in the area later known as Bohemia, a confederation of Germanic tribes, with the Hermunduri, Lombards, Semnoni and Vandals.
 Lucius Domitius Ahenobarbus commands the Roman army in Germania and crosses the Elbe. He builds the pontes longi (“long bridges”) over the marshes between the Rhine and the Ems.

Births 
 December 24 – Servius Sulpicius Galba, Roman emperor (d. AD 69)
 Seneca the Younger, Roman statesman and philosopher (d. AD 65)

Deaths 
 Fu, Chinese grand empress of the Han Dynasty (approximate date)

References